Anne-Marie Goumba (born 9 October 1954), is a member of the National Assembly of the Central African Republic and as a member of the Pan-African Parliament from the Central African Republic. She is the widow of long-time Central African politician Abel Goumba.

Early life
Anne-Marie Mbakondo was born on 9 October 1954 in Nyanza, Rwanda. She first undertook higher education at the École Normale Supérieure in Save, Rwanda, before moving on to study at the Université Catholique d'Afrique Centrale. She subsequently undertook a teaching role as a professor at the Butare Faculty of Medicine between 1973 and 1977. While there, she met Abel Goumba, who was also a lecturer on public health issues, later marrying him.

Political career
Her husband was a long-time Central African political reformer, who founded what eventually became the Patriotic Front for Progress party. She too supported the work of the FPP, and stood in the 2005 Central African general election and was elected as a deputy for Bangui's fifth district with 37.32 percent in the 8 May runoff. In the same election, her husband lost his seat. After being named to the National Assembly of the Central African Republic, she was named as a Central African representative to the Pan-African Parliament. In January 2015, she praised the peacekeeping efforts in Rwanda, saying that while she has lived in the Central African Republic for 30 years, she never forgets that she came from Rwanda. She is the coordinator of the non government organisation Les Flamboyants, which seeks to prevent violence against women and children.

References

1954 births
Living people
Members of the National Assembly (Central African Republic)
Members of the Pan-African Parliament from the Central African Republic
Patriotic Front for Progress politicians
Central African Republic women in politics
Rwandan emigrants to the Central African Republic
21st-century Rwandan women politicians
21st-century Rwandan politicians
Women members of the Pan-African Parliament
Catholic University of Central Africa alumni
People from Nyanza District